Red Fields is a 2019 Israeli drama film directed by Keren Yedaya. It was screened in the Contemporary World Cinema section at the 2019 Toronto International Film Festival.

Cast
 Neta Elkayam as Mamy
 Ami Abu as Nissim
 Riki Gal as Batia
 Yuval Banai as Yaki

References

External links
 

2019 films
2019 drama films
Israeli drama films
2010s Hebrew-language films